Thomas William Hirsch (born January 27, 1963) is an American retired professional ice hockey player, who played 31 games in the National Hockey League between 1984 and 1988 for the Minnesota North Stars. He was also a member of the American national team at the 1984 Winter Olympics, 1984 Canada Cup and 1982 World Championships. His career was ended by persistent shoulder injury problems. Tom's daughter Casey played forward and was the captain of the Maple Grove Senior High School Girls Hockey Team her senior year. She also played for the Syracuse University Orange, Women's Hockey Team starting fall of 2011.

Career statistics

Regular season and playoffs

International

References

External links
 
 Hirsch's hockeydraftcentral bio

1963 births
Living people
American men's ice hockey defensemen
Ice hockey players at the 1984 Winter Olympics
Ice hockey people from Minneapolis
Minnesota Golden Gophers men's ice hockey players
Minnesota North Stars draft picks
Minnesota North Stars players
Olympic ice hockey players of the United States
Springfield Indians players